The División de Honor de Béisbol 2017 was the 32nd season of the top Spanish baseball league since its establishment and the 72nd Spanish championship overall.

Tenerife Marlins achieved its ninth title.

Teams

League table

References

External links
Spanish Baseball and Softball Federation website

División de Honor de Béisbol